Gar is a rural locality (a village) in Kargopolsky District, Arkhangelsk Oblast, Russia. The population was 15 as of 2012.

Geography 
Gar is located 54 km north of Kargopol (the district's administrative centre) by road. Shiryaikha is the nearest rural locality.

References 

Rural localities in Kargopolsky District